The 2010 Maaco Bowl Las Vegas was an NCAA-sanctioned Division I FBS post-season college football bowl game. The game was played Wednesday, December 22, 2010, at 5 p.m. PST at 40,000-seat Sam Boyd Stadium near Las Vegas, broadcast on ESPN. The game featured Utah against Boise State.

Teams

Utah Utes

Utah was one of the teams participating in the 2010 bowl. The Utes entered the game with the longest current bowl winning streak at nine games and had never lost a bowl game under current head coach Kyle Whittingham.  Utah entered the game with a 10–2 overall record and a #19 ranking in the BCS poll.  The Utes had played in the Las Vegas bowl twice before, defeating Fresno State 17–16 in 1999 and beating USC 10–6 in 2001.  The 1999 victory over Fresno State started the nine game bowl winning streak.

Boise State Broncos

Boise State was invited to the bowl after not enough Pac-10 teams were bowl-eligible to meet their contractual requirements. The #10 (BCS) Broncos entered the game with an 11–1 record, their only loss coming at Nevada on November 26; BSU split the WAC title with Nevada and Hawai'i. Before the Nevada game, they were in line for a possible at-large selection to a BCS bowl game.  Even at 11-1, they were still eligible as an at-large selection but were not taken. The 2010 game marked BSU's first Maaco Bowl Las Vegas appearance. The Broncos entered with an all-time bowl record of 6–4; in their last bowl appearance, they defeated TCU in the 2010 Fiesta Bowl.

Game summary

Scoring

Statistics

Game notes
The two schools, which have been considered among the best non-AQ programs in the Football Bowl Subdivision, had previously met on six occasions. Boise State held a 4–2 advantage in prior matchups.  The previous meeting between the two schools was a 36–3 win by the Broncos in 2006. That matchup was played in Salt Lake City. The Maaco Bowl Las Vegas marked the first time that the programs met in a bowl game.

Utah left the Mountain West Conference for the Pac-12 Conference after the season, while Boise State joined the MWC from the Western Athletic Conference.

References

Maaco Bowl Las Vegas
Las Vegas Bowl
Boise State Broncos football bowl games
Utah Utes football bowl games
Las Vegas Bowl
December 2010 sports events in the United States
21st century in Las Vegas